was a Japanese samurai of the 16th–17th centuries. The eldest son of Higuchi Kanetoyo, Kanetsugu was famed for his service to two generations of the Uesugi daimyōs. He was also known by his court title, Yamashiro no Kami (山城守) or his childhood name, .

Kanetsugu served first as a koshō (小姓) to Uesugi Kenshin. After Kenshin had died, he served Kagekatsu, the adopted son of Kenshin. Kanetsugu's brother, Ōkuni Sanehiro, was also a famous Uesugi retainer.

Biography
Kanetsugu was born , at Sakato Castle in Echigo Province. His father, Higuchi Sōemon Kanetoyo, was a senior retainer of Nagao Masakage, the lord of Sakato Castle. When Yoroku came of age he married his first cousin Osen from his maternal side, the widow of Uesugi retainer Naoe Nobutsuna, and took the Naoe family name in order to become head of the family line since Osen did not have any children from the previous marriage nor have any male heir available to succeed the family.

Kanetsugu became an Uesugi councilor at the age of 22, quickly distinguished himself as an outstanding commander, he fought at Battle of Tedorigawa and was involved in much of the fighting that took place on the Sea of Japan coast against Sassa Narimasa and Maeda Toshiie. 
In 1590, he fought in the Odawara Campaign at Hachiōji Castle.  In 1600, Kanetsugu was also responsible for the actions of the Uesugi clan against the allies of the Tokugawa during the lead-up to the climactic Battle of Sekigahara. Following the Uesugi clan's surrender to the Tokugawa, in 1601, their holdings were transferred to the much smaller fief of Yonezawa, with an income of 300,000 koku. Kanetsugu was granted a stipend shortly before he retired.

After death
Following his death, his wife Lady Osen (お船), per the custom at the time, took the tonsure, cutting her hair short and becoming a Buddhist nun. She was renamed Lady Teishin-ni (貞心尼). Teishin-ni helped rear the young Uesugi heir, Uesugi Sadakatsu, eventually dying in 1637 at the age of 81.

Personality
Naoe Kanetsugu was respected for his judgment. In "The Life of Toyotomi Hideyoshi," Walter and M.E. Dening recount an anecdote in which Hideyoshi, whose temporary unification of Japan paved the way for Ieyasu's shogunate, decides to visit Uesugi Kagekatsu, Kanetsugu's liege lord at the time, in person, accompanied by just a few retainers.

On receipt of the news, Kagekatsu called a council to discuss what was best to do under the circumstances. The majority of the councilors advised the assassination of Hideyoshi, arguing that this was by far the simplest way of ridding themselves of a dangerous enemy. But Naoe Kanetsugu condemned this advice as unworthy of a man holding the position of Kagekatsu. "Hideyoshi's coming among us unguarded," said Kanetsugu, "is proof of his profound respect for our master. With lesser personages Hideyoshi would not so expose himself to danger. Knowing that our lord is a man of noble disposition, he trusts himself among us. Were we take advantage of this and slay him, the story of our baseness and treachery would be handed down to distant posterity to our eternal shame. No: let our master meet magnanimity with magnanimity; let him have an audience with Hideyoshi and let them see whether they cannot come to an understanding. If they cannot agree, then we will fight, but not till Hideyoshi has been sent back to his own country."

In popular culture
The 2009 48th NHK Taiga drama Tenchijin was a dramatization of his life.
He is a playable character in Pokémon Conquest (Pokémon + Nobunaga's Ambition in Japan), with his partner Pokémon being Alakazam". He is also in all of the games of Koei's Samurai Warriors and Warriors Orochi game series as well as being in the game Kessen as a minor general named "Naod". An alternate Reality version appears in the game Sengoku Rance, as a woman, Naoe Ai.

In KissxSis, he is the fantasy of Yūzuki Kiryū, Keita's teacher. She has so many items dedicated to him, including body pillows, action figures and even a replica armour and weapon.

Kanetsugu appears in the Samurai Warriors series as a young samurai from the Uesugi clan who later befriended Sanada Yukimura and Ishida Mitsunari, his weapons are a sword and paper charms.

Kanetsugu is also represented, though in fictional female form, in the popular Anime 'Hyakka Ryoran: Samurai Girls', and its sequel 'Samurai Bride'.

In the Light Novel Nekomomogatarai (Black) from the Monogatari Series the protagonist Koyomi Araragi compares himself to Naoe to counter his little sister Tsukihi who accused him of being a "loveless person". 

See People of the Sengoku period in popular culture.

References

See also
 Uesugi Kenshin

External links
 "TEN-CHI-JIN" General of UESUGI Clan NAOE KANETSUGU - (Japanese)-Kabuto(Samurai Helmet) Papercraft

Samurai
1559 births
1620 deaths
Karō
Uesugi retainers
Deified Japanese people